John Dickson Greenhill (23 June 1897 – 2 July 1977) was an Australian rules football player who served with the Australian Imperial Force during World War I. His brother Charlie Greenhill was also an Australian rules footballer.

Playing career
Having arrived from Corryong, Greenhill made his debut for Carlton in the Victorian Football League during the 1916 season. After a break due to military service, he rejoined the club for the 1920 VFL season playing 13 games in a Carlton team that made it to the Preliminary Final. The following year he played 19 matches, playing in the Blues team that lost the 1921 VFL Grand Final to Richmond. He also represented Victoria at the 1921 Perth Carnival.

Military service
Greenhill enlisted with the Australian Imperial Force in April 1917 and left Melbourne on the HMAT Port Sydney in November 1917. He was attached to the 8th Field Artillery Brigade as a gunner. He returned to Australia in July 1919.

References

External links

 

1897 births
1977 deaths
People from Corryong
Carlton Football Club players
Australian rules footballers from Victoria (Australia)
Australian military personnel of World War I